The Loudon Classic, originally named the Laconia Classic, is an annual motorcycle road racing competition held during the Laconia Motorcycle Week at the New Hampshire Motor Speedway in Loudon, New Hampshire. Founded in 1934 when it was originally sanctioned by the American Motorcyclist Association (AMA), the race is one of the oldest motorcycle competitions in the United States. The competition changed locations over the years, starting as a dirt track race before evolving into a road race. From the late 1930s until the early 2000s, the Loudon Classic was one of the most prestigious motorcycle races in the United States, second only to the Daytona 200.

History

Rally Beginnings
In the 1910s the New Hampshire Lakes Region became a popular riding destination for early motorcycle enthusiasts. Unlike the Sturgis Motorcycle Rally which originated as a motorcycle race, the Loudon Classic originated as a motorcycle rally. When motorcycle sales began to decline as a result of the introduction of the low cost Ford Model T, the American motorcycle industry body, the Federation of American Motorcyclists (FAM) sought to boost sales by sponsoring a series of Gypsy tours, so called because the participants camped in large gatherings like Romani people. The annual tour held at Weirs Beach in Laconia, New Hampshire on the southern shore of Lake Winnipesaukee, became the most popular of these tours due to its proximity to Boston, New York, Philadelphia and Montreal.

Dirt track roots
In 1933, the AMA introduced a new racing category called Class C which featured street-legal motorcycles in an effort to make motorcycle racing less expensive for ordinary motorcyclists. Street-legal motorcycles were known at the time as touring motorcycles hence, a tourist trophy (TT) signified a race classification for street-legal motorcycles. Informal motorcycle racing had occurred at previous Weirs Beach rallies however, the first race formally sanctioned by the American Motorcyclist Association (AMA), occurred in 1934 when, a  dirt track TT race for Class C motorcycles was held on a 3.3 mile track in Swanzey, New Hampshire that used partially paved and unimproved gravel roads, up and down gently rolling hills. Local rider Babe Tancrede won the inaugural Laconia Classic riding a Harley-Davidson.

Belknap circuit
In 1937 the race moved to Old Orchard Beach, Maine where it was held as a  event for only one year then, in 1938 it was moved to a 1.0-mile track in the Belknap Recreational Area, now known as the Gunstock Mountain Resort near Laconia, New Hampshire. The Belknap circuit featured crudely paved roads as well as improved gravel roads. Although the event became known as the Laconia Classic, the Belknap Recreational Area was located in nearby Gilford, New Hampshire. An integral promoter responsible for bringing the race to Belknap was Fritzie Baer, an Indian motorcycle dealer from Springfield, Massachusetts who would promote the race until 1963. 

Along with the move to Belknap, the event was accredited national championship status by the AMA in 1938. Indian rider Ed Kretz, who had won the inaugural Daytona 200 in 1937, won the first  national championship race held at Belknap in 1938. His victory marked the only 200 mile Laconia Classic as, the race distance was reduced to 100 miles in 1939. In 1940, the circuit was converted from dirt and gravel to a fully paved course and, the AMA changed the race classification from a TT national to a road race national. 

Dick Klamfoth's 1951 Laconia Classic victory on a Norton marked the first win by a foreign manufacturer. Harley-Davidson rider Brad Andres was the most successful competitor during the Belknap era with four victories in five years between 1955 and 1959. Three-time Grand National Champion Joe Leonard won the event three times before going on to a successful auto racing career. Harley-Davidson would win 13 of the 20 races held at Belknap, despite the track being near the Springfield, Massachusetts factory of their largest competitor, Indian motorcycles. 

The event surged in popularity after the Second World War drawing increasingly larger crowds of spectators. The race grew to become a weeklong event known as Laconia Motorcycle Week that was the largest annual gathering of North American motorcyclists, until it was overtaken by the Sturgis Motorcycle Rally during the 1970s. When the overwhelming number of spectators created a rash of minor incidents in 1963, local residents protested the event. Unwilling to risk the increasing costs of property damage, and unable to reach an agreement with local officials, race promoters closed the Belknap track in 1964. The final race at the Belknap circuit held in 1963 was won by Jody Nicholas riding a BSA motorcycle.

Bryar Motorsports Park
The closure of the Belknap circuit resulted in the construction of the new 1.6-mile Bryar Motorsports Park in 1965, located 20 miles south of Laconia in Loudon, New Hampshire. The Laconia Classic gradually became known as the Loudon Classic. The Bryar Motorsports Park track road course followed the contours of a hillside around a small lake. Compressing 11 turns within its 1.6-mile length, the track was short and tight, making it one of the best venues to watch motorcycle racing in the United States. Slight elevation changes in the track layout allowed many spectators to follow a racer for a complete lap of the circuit. 

The track developed a reputation for its challenging nature as, riders were constantly applying throttle or their brakes for the entire lap. It rewarded a rider's skill over horsepower and its many turns allowed for aggressive racing. The circuit hosted numerous amateur races during the year which bred many local track experts who often provided challenging competition for national championship level riders when they arrived for the annual Loudon Classic.

Gary Nixon and Mike Baldwin were the most successful competitors during the Bryar Motorsports era, each with four victories. When Gary Fisher won the race in 1972 riding a Yamaha, he joined his father, 1953 Laconia Classic winner Ed Fisher, as the only father son duo to have won the race. His victory aboard a Yamaha also marked the first victory by a Japanese manufacturer in the history of the event. Fisher's 1972 victory marked the last 100-mile national as, the race distance was reduced to 75-miles for 1973. Carter Alsop became the first female competitor in an AMA professional road race when she entered the Novice Class at the 1977 Loudon Classic. Jamie James won the final race on the Bryar Motorsports Park circuit in 1989 before it was purchased by Bob Bahre, who built the New Hampshire Motor Speedway in its place.

New Hampshire Motor Speedway
Construction of the New Hampshire Motor Speedway was completed in 1990. The Loudon Classic continued as a national championship race at the new speedway until 2001 however, a combination of safety issues and more powerful motorcycles eventually made the track obsolete for AMA Superbike events. Eric Bostrom won the final AMA National Championship race at Loudon in 2001. Since 2002 the race has continued featuring amateur racers.

Laconia & Loudon Classic Winners

Key

References 

Motorsport in New Hampshire
Motorcycle races in the United States
1934 establishments in New Hampshire
Recurring sporting events established in 1934
Annual sporting events in the United States
Superbike racing
American Motorcyclist Association